The 2022–23 season is the 137th season of competitive football and fourth consecutive season in the Championship played by Luton Town Football Club, a professional association football club based in Luton, Bedfordshire, England. Luton will also compete in the FA Cup and EFL Cup. The season covers the period from 1 July 2022 to 30 June 2023.

Background and pre-season

Luton Town's pre-season programme began with an away friendly match against Hitchin Town before a week-long training camp in Slovenia, which included a friendly against Slovenian PrvaLiga club Bravo. After returning from Slovenia, Luton played a behind-closed-doors match against Gillingham at The Brache training ground, followed by friendlies away to Northampton Town and Peterborough United, and at home to West Ham United.

EFL Championship

July–August
Luton began the season with a goalless draw at home to Birmingham City; new signings Ethan Horvath, Luke Freeman and Carlton Morris were all in the starting lineup, and Cauley Woodrow came on as a substitute to make his first appearance for the club in over a decade. The next match also resulted in a draw; Dan Potts scored the team's first league goal in a 1–1 draw away to Burnley.

Match results

Partial league table

FA Cup

The Hatters entered the competition in the third round and were drawn at home to Wigan Athletic and then to Grimsby Town in the fourth round.

EFL Cup

Luton were drawn at home to League Two club Newport County in the first round.

Transfers

In

 Brackets around club names indicate the player's contract with that club had expired before he joined Luton.
 * Signed primarily for the development squad

Out

 Brackets around club names indicate the player joined that club after his Luton contract expired.

Loan in

Loan out

Appearances and goals
Source:
Numbers in parentheses denote appearances as substitute.
Players with names struck through and marked  left the club during the playing season.
Players with names in italics and marked * were on loan from another club for the whole of their season with Luton.
Players listed with no appearances have been in the matchday squad but only as unused substitutes.
Key to positions: GK – Goalkeeper; DF – Defender; MF – Midfielder; FW – Forward

References

Luton Town F.C. seasons
Luton Town
English football clubs 2022–23 season